Urbiztondo, officially the Municipality of Urbiztondo, is a 3rd class municipality in the province of Pangasinan, Philippines. According to the 2020 census, it has a population of 55,557 people.

History
The municipality was named after Spanish governor-general General Antonio de Urbiztondo y Villasis who acted as Spanish Governor in the Philippines and was also conqueror of the Muslims in Jolo from 1850 to 1852. He then issued a decree founding the town and consequently the newly formed town was named “Urbiztondo” in his honor. The Municipality of Urbiztondo's establishment as a town was primarily due to Fr. Ramon Dalmau, the parish priest of San Carlos, who began its foundation in 1852, separating the said town from San Carlos now a city. The initiative in the emergence of Urbiztondo came from the pioneering fathers from San Carlos, Pangasinan. Its creation has been credited to Rev. Father Ramon Dalmau, curate of San Carlos who worked hard for its founding on November 28, 1853. It remained a visita of San Carlos in the year 1852. It was separated from San Carlos on the above date when it was assigned its own curate. The Dominicans accepted Urbiztondo as a vicariate in 1855 designating Rev. Father Francisco Treserra who is also responsible for relocating the town to the place where it is now located.

Geography

Barangays
Urbiztondo is politically subdivided into 21 barangays. These barangays are headed by elected officials: Barangay Captain, Barangay Council, whose members are called Barangay Councilors. All are elected every three years.

Climate

Demographics

Economy

Government
Urbiztondo, belonging to the second congressional district of the province of Pangasinan, is governed by a mayor designated as its local chief executive and by a municipal council as its legislative body in accordance with the Local Government Code. The mayor, vice mayor, and the councilors are elected directly by the people through an election which is being held every three years.

Elected officials

References

External links

 Urbiztondo Profile at PhilAtlas.com
 Municipal Profile at the National Competitiveness Council of the Philippines
 Urbiztondo at the Pangasinan Government Website
 Local Governance Performance Management System
 [ Philippine Standard Geographic Code]
 Philippine Census Information

Municipalities of Pangasinan
Populated places on the Agno River